Jacques Hilling (26 May 1922 – 16 February 1975) was a French film actor. He appeared in more than 90 films between 1949 and 1975.

Selected filmography

 Return to Life (1949) - Un soldat (segment 4 : "Le retour de René") (uncredited)
 Rendezvous in July (1949) -  Bit part (uncredited)
 The Red Rose (1951) - M. Guillet
 Good Enough to Eat (1951) - Pou - le frère de Madame de Mergrand
 Pas de vacances pour Monsieur le Maire (1951) - Le docteur
 La Putain respectueuse (1952) - L'ivrogne du night-club
 Open Letter (1953) - Le flic - M. Pépin
 Les Compagnes de la nuit (1953) - Le concierge (uncredited)
 Thérèse Raquin (1953)
 Virgile (1953) - Le professeur
 Le Guérisseur (1953) - Un journaliste
 Les hommes ne pensent qu'à ça (1954) - Le roi Dagobert / Un marcheur
 Les Diaboliques (1955) - L'employé de la morgue
 French Cancan (1955) - Le chirurgien (uncredited)
 Bedevilled (1955) - Taxi Driver (uncredited)
 Madelon (1955) - Soldat
 On déménage le colonel (1955) - Auguste
 Marie Antoinette Queen of France (1956) - Duc de Brunswick
 Meeting in Paris (1956) - Le poissonnier écailleur (uncredited)
 Toute la ville accuse (1956)
 Gervaise (1956) - M. Boche - le mari de la concierge
 Elena and Her Men (1956) - Lisbonne
 La Famille Anodin (1956, TV Series)
 Paris, Palace Hotel (1956) - Le cuistot
 Crime and Punishment (1956) - Le concierge (uncredited)
 The Hunchback of Notre Dame (1956) - Maitre Charmolue
 Que les hommes sont bêtes (1957) - Le commissaire
 Le grand bluff (1957) - Marcel Poitevin
 La peau de l'ours (1957) - Le chauffeur de taxi
 Les Espions (1957) - Un espion (uncredited)
 Amour de poche (1957) - Le professeur
 Le triporteur (1957) - L'entraîneur du club
 Mam'zelle Souris (1957)
 Maigret Sets a Trap (1958) - Le médecin légiste
 Elevator to the Gallows (1958) - Le garagiste
 It's All Adam's Fault (1958)
 Les Jeux dangereux (1958) - L'inspecteur
 Clara et les méchants (1958) - Le professeur de gymnastique
 The Female (1959) - Le serveur
 Guinguette (1959) - Doctor
 Bobosse (1959) - (uncredited)
 Babette Goes to War (1959) - Captain
 Maigret et l'Affaire Saint-Fiacre (1959) - Le garçon de café bavard
 Les Liaisons dangereuses (1959) - Un invité des Valmont (uncredited)
 Rue des prairies (1959) - Le patron de l'hôtel Stella
 Quai du Point-du-Jour (1960) - Un ouvrier (uncredited)
 Le Baron de l'écluse (1960) - Le surveillant des jeux
 Bouche cousue (1960) - Polo
 Le mouton (1960) - L'inspecteur Lenfant
 The Truth (1960) - Un client du 'Spoutnik'
 Les portes claquent (1960) - Le chauffeur
 The End of Belle (1961)
 La Princesse de Clèves (1961) - Le Médecin
 Please, Not Now! (1961) - L'opéré de la jambe
 The Three Musketeers (1961) - La Chesnaye
 The Fabiani Affair (1962) - Grenier (uncredited)
 Le bateau d'Émile (1962)
 Cartouche (1962) - L'aubergiste
 Lemmy pour les dames (1962) -  Le directeur de l'hôtel
 Le Chevalier de Pardaillan (1962) - Le chambellan du duc de Guise
 L'abominable homme des douanes (1963) - Police Officer Joly
 People in Luck (1963) - Le journaliste (segment "Une nuit avec une vedette")
 Les vierges (1963) - Le patron de Berthet
 À toi de faire... mignonne (1963)
 Thank You, Natercia (1963) - Petit rôle (uncredited)
 Hardi Pardaillan! (1964) - Le notaire
 Une ravissante idiote (1964) - Le Lord-Admiral
 Shadow of Evil (1964) - Professor Hogby
 Angélique, Marquise des Anges (1964) - Molines
 Marvelous Angelique (1965) - Molines
 Marie-Chantal contre le docteur Kha (1965) - (uncredited)
  (1965)
 Angelique and the King (1965) - Molinès (uncredited)
 Brigade antigangs (1966) - Le monsieur du stade
 Two for the Road (1967) - Hotel Concierge (uncredited)
  (1968) - L'homme du relais (uncredited)
  (1969) - Polyte
 Elle boit pas, elle fume pas, elle drague pas, mais... elle cause ! (1970) - Le fêtard avec Francine (uncredited)
  (1970) - Le médecin légiste
  (1971) - Le second client du "sexy shop"
  (1971) - Fernand
 Daisy Town (1971) - (voice)
 Le Viager (1972) - Le président du tribunal
 The Day of the Jackal (1973) - Hotel Desk Clerk (uncredited)
 The Clockmaker (1974) - Costes - un journaliste
 Que la fête commence (1975) - L'abbé Gratellard
 The Twelve Tasks of Asterix (1975) - (voice)

References

External links

1922 births
1975 deaths
French male film actors
20th-century French male actors
Burials at Père Lachaise Cemetery